Snowy Hydro Limited is an electricity generation and retailing company in Australia that owns, manages, and maintains the Snowy Mountains Hydro-electric Scheme which consists of nine hydro-electric power stations and sixteen large dams connected by 145 kilometres (90 mi) of tunnels and 80 kilometres (50 mi) of aqueducts located mainly in the Kosciuszko National Park. Snowy Hydro also owns and operates two gas-fired power stations in Victoria and one in New South Wales, three diesel power stations in South Australia and owns two electricity retailing businesses, Red Energy and Lumo Energy.

The company is owned by the Government of Australia and whilst not a statutory corporation, is established by the Snowy Mountains Hydro-electric Power Act 1949 (Cth). Prior to its incorporation under the Corporations Act 2001 (Cth), the company was previously known as Snowy Mountains Hydro-electric Authority.

Generating assets
The company manages the Snowy Mountains Scheme which generates on average around 4,500 gigawatt hours of clean, renewable energy each year, which was around 37% of all renewable energy in the mainland National Electricity Market in 2010.

The company also owns a 300 MW gas-fired peaking power station in the Latrobe Valley, a 320 MW gas-fired peaking power station at Laverton North near Melbourne, and a 667 MW gas-fired peaking power station at Colongra on the Central Coast of New South Wales. It also owns three diesel-powered peaking power stations in South Australia providing 136 MW between them. The company's production assets are summarised in the table below. These assets are used to generate electricity for sale under contract to the National Electricity Market.

Water storage and diversion
As part of the company's responsibilities for managing the Snowy Mountain Scheme, Snowy Hydro Limited also collects, stores, and diverts water for irrigation from the Snowy Mountains catchment west to the Murray and Murrumbidgee River systems under what is called the Snowy Water Licence. The Snowy Water Licence also imposes some obligations on the company in terms of releasing environmental flows east into the Snowy River and other rivers in the Snowy Mountains region.

Proposed public divestment
In December 2005, the Government of New South Wales announced it would sell its 58% share in Snowy Hydro, expecting to yield A$1 billion. The Federal and Victorian governments had followed suit, announcing by mid-February 2006 the intent to sell their 13% and 29% respectively, with A$1.7 billion (ranging up to A$3 billion) expectations through a public float. Pre-registration for shares in Snowy Hydro opened in mid May and it was expected that the float would take place some time in July. Over 200,000 people pre-registered to purchase shares in the company over two weeks.

On 2 June 2006, the Federal Government announced that it would no longer sell its 13% stake in the project, effectively forcing the hands of the New South Wales and Victorian governments to follow suit. The aborted sale followed strong opposition from the public, including government MPs and prominent Australians.

In February 2014 the National Commission of Audit recommended in its Phase One Report that the Federal Government sell its interest in Snowy Hydro. In March 2018, the Federal Government bought out the New South Wales and Victorian government shareholdings.

Current market position
Since privatisation was cancelled in 2006, the company has continued to grow with investment into Snowy Scheme modernisation projects, cloud seeding, development of mini hydro opportunities such as the 14 MW Jounama mini-hydro (commissioned in 2010) and growth of its retailing business, Red Energy. In September 2014 Snowy Hydro purchased gas and electricity retailer Lumo Energy for $600 million. Red Energy currently has 1.6 million electricity and gas customers. 

In addition Snowy Hydro has developed its gas-fired power station portfolio to reduce risks to the business due to its reliance on water as an energy source, and the potential impact of transmission constraints on the ability of the remote Snowy Mountains hydro generation assets to access the electricity grid. In January 2015 Snowy Hydro acquired the gas-fired Colongra Power Station in New South Wales.

References

External links
  Construction Images
 Snowy Hydro company website
 Audiovisual titles relating to the building of the Snowy Hydro Scheme on australianscreen
https://aboutregional.com.au/hundreds-gather-to-celebrate-the-mighty-snowy-scheme/

Companies based in New South Wales
Electric power companies of Australia
Former government-owned companies of New South Wales
Commonwealth Government-owned companies of Australia
Government-owned companies of Victoria (Australia)
Snowy Mountains Scheme
1949 establishments in Australia